James Kendrick was an English physician and antiquary.

Life
Born in Warrington, which then was in Lancashire, on 7 November 1809, he was the son of the physician James Kendrick (1771–1847). He graduated M.D. at Edinburgh on 1 August 1833, and then built up a large medical practice in Warrington.

Kendrick frequently lectured on local topography and history. In 1853 he became a member of the British Archæological Association. In 1859 he took charge of the antiquities in the Warrington Museum, and added to the collection. He forwarded the excavations at the Roman station at Wilderspool, near Warrington, which (with Dr. Robson) he thought might be the Condate of Antonine.

Kendrick died at Warrington 6 April 1882.

Legacy
Kendrick gave the Museum remains discovered at Wilderspool. After his death, his daughter also handed over to the museum his collection of ecclesiastical and medieval seals and his bequest of one hundred volumes. He gave more than three hundred books bearing a Warrington imprint to the public library.

Works
Kendrick wrote the following books:

 An Account of Excavations made at the Mote Hill, Warrington, Liverpool, 1853.
 , illustrated with silhouette likenesses. 
 Account of the Loyal Warrington Volunteers of 1798, 1856.
 Guide Book to the Warrington Museum, 1872.

Papers by Kendrick appeared in the publications of the Historic Society of Lancashire and Cheshire, Chester Archæological Society, The Reliquary, and Warrington Guardian. A memoir of him in the Palatine Note-Book (ii. 113–16, 179–80) gives a list of his writings, including contributions to newspapers and antiquarian periodicals.

Family
Kendrick was married three times.

Notes

Attribution

1809 births
1882 deaths
19th-century English medical doctors
English antiquarians
People from Warrington